Beaverdam Creek is a  long 3rd order tributary to Lanes Creek in Union County, North Carolina.

Course
Beaverdam Creek rises in a pond about 3 miles south of Wingate, North Carolina.  Beaverdam Creek then flows northeast to meet Lanes Creek about 2.5 miles southeast of Marshville.

Watershed
Beaverdam Creek drains  of area, receives about 48.3 in/year of precipitation, has a topographic wetness index of 439.41 and is about 37% forested.

References

Rivers of North Carolina
Rivers of Union County, North Carolina
Tributaries of the Pee Dee River